is a Japanese actress and model. She is best known for dual roles in the 2012-13 Kamen Rider Series Kamen Rider Wizard as Misa/Medusa and as Mayu Inamori/Kamen Rider Mage. She was represented by the agency Stardust Promotion.

Filmography

TV series

Films

References

21st-century Japanese actresses
Japanese television personalities
Japanese female models
1995 births
Living people
Actors from Chiba Prefecture
Models from Chiba Prefecture